Dotta tura is a species of butterfly in the family Hesperiidae. It is found in Tanzania in the Ungaru Mountains.

References

Endemic fauna of Tanzania
Butterflies described in 1951
Astictopterini